Brandon Santini (born February 3, 1982) is an American roots rock and blues harmonica player, singer and songwriter.  Several of his releases have made the national Billboard Blues Chart.  He has been nominated for multiple Blues Music Awards and multiple Blues Blast Music Awards. Blues Blast magazine called him "one of the best harp players in the blues scene today." His music is featured in The NBC Peacock Network’s original series, “Poker Face.”

Background 
Santini was born in Chapel Hill, North Carolina, United States, and took up harmonica at age 15 after hearing Blues Traveler vocalist and harmonica player John Popper. Not only influenced by Popper, he was also influenced by the classic blues harp players of the 1950s and 1960s. He moved to Memphis, Tennessee, at the age of 21 where he mastered playing the blues in clubs on Beale Street.

Career
Santini was raised in Burlington, North Carolina, then moved to Memphis, Tennessee in his early 20s. His love for the blues took off after discovering John Popper and Paul Butterfield He soon formed the band Delta Highway which released an album in 2008 entitled The Devil Had A Woman. After the breakup of Delta Highway, Santini released his debut album, Songs of Love, Money and Misery, in 2011. In 2013, Santini released This Time Another Year. The album was nominated for numerous Blues Music Awards. It was recorded at the Ardent Studios.
His 2019 album, The Longshot, was released to positive reviews and peaked at Number 7 on the Billboard Blues Album Chart. In 2019, Santini became an endorsed artist for Hohner Harmonicas. He announced his new group Tennessee Redemption, a band co-fronted with Jeff Jensen in mid 2019. He won a Blues Blast Music Award in 2019 for best Contemporary Blues Album.

Throughout Santini’s career he has toured the world including concerts throughout North America, Europe, India, and Egypt. Santini has shared the stage with notable artists such as Beth Hart, Gary Clark Jr., Charlie Musselwhite, Randy Houser, Parmalee, Bernie Marsden, Maggie Bell, The Record Company and members of Live.

Santini has performed numerous times on Joe Bonamassa's Keeping The Blues Alive At Sea Cruise.

Santini’s song, “Got Good Lovin” is featured in episode three of The NBC Peacock Network’s original series, “Poker Face” starring Natasha Lyonne, Benjamin Bratt & Adrien Brody.

Discography
 Songs of Love, Money and Misery - 2011
 This Time Another Year - 2013
 Live & Extended! - 2015
 The Longshot - 2019
 Tennessee Redemption - 2019
 Don't Shake The Devil's Hand - 2022

References

American harmonica players
Musicians from North Carolina
1982 births
Living people